Soley may refer to:

Surname
Clive Soley, Baron Soley (born 1939), Labour Party politician in the United Kingdom
James R. Soley (1850–1911), lawyer, Naval historian, Assistant Secretary of the Navy in the U.S. Navy
Jane Soley Hamilton (1805–1897), pioneer midwife in Brookfield, Nova Scotia 
Jordi Pujol i Soley (born 1930), Catalan politician
K. Soley (born 1983), Malaysian footballer who plays as a right midfielder
Richard Soley, chair and CEO of Object Management Group, Inc.
Seyfo Soley (born 1980), Gambian football (soccer) midfielder
Steve Soley (born 1971), English footballer
Tomás Enrique Soley Soler (1939–2001), Costa Rican politician

Given name or mononym or nickname
Sóley (musician), a singer and pianist who also performs in the Icelandic band Seabear
Guðrún Sóley Gunnarsdóttir (born 1982), Icelandic football player who plays as a defender
Sóley (given name), the name.

Title
Clive Soley, Baron Soley (born 1939), Labour Party politician in the United Kingdom

See also
USS Soley (DD-707), an Allen M. Sumner–class destroyer, named for James R. Soley